Dreaming of You may refer to:

 Dreaming of You (Selena album) (1995)
 "Dreaming of You" (Selena song) (1995)
 Dreaming of You (Juris album) (2012) or its title song
 "Dreaming of You" (The Coral song) (2002)
 "Dreamin' of You" (Celine Dion song) (1996)
 "Dreamin' of You" (Bob Dylan song), an out-take from the 1997 album Time Out Of Mind
 "Dreamin' of You", a 2013 song by Buckcherry from Confessions
 "Dreaming of You", a 2001 song by Sloan from Pretty Together